Alexander Sergeyevich Pushkin was a Russian poet, playwright, and novelist of the Romantic era. He is considered by many to be the greatest Russian poet and the founder of modern Russian literature.

Pushkin was born into the Russian nobility in Moscow. His father, Sergey Lvovich Pushkin, belonged to an old noble family. His maternal great-grandfather was Major-General Abram Petrovich Gannibal, a nobleman of African origin who was kidnapped from his homeland and raised in the Emperor's court household as his godson. 

He published his first poem at the age of 15, and was widely recognized by the literary establishment by the time of his graduation from the Tsarskoye Selo Lyceum. Upon graduation from the Lycée, Pushkin recited his controversial poem "Ode to Liberty", one of several that led to his exile by Emperor Alexander I. While under the strict surveillance of the Emperor's political police and unable to publish, Pushkin wrote his most famous play, Boris Godunov. His novel in verse, Eugene Onegin, was serialized between 1825 and 1832. Pushkin was fatally wounded in a duel with his wife's alleged lover and her sister's husband, Georges-Charles de Heeckeren d'Anthès, also known as Dantes-Gekkern, a French officer serving with the Chevalier Guard Regiment.

Ancestry

Pushkin's father, Sergei Lvovich Pushkin (1767–1848), was descended from a distinguished family of the Russian nobility that traced its ancestry back to the 12th century. Pushkin's mother, Nadezhda (Nadya) Ossipovna Gannibal (1775–1836), was descended through her paternal grandmother from German and Scandinavian nobility. She was the daughter of Ossip Abramovich Gannibal (1744–1807) and his wife, Maria Alekseyevna Pushkina (1745–1818).

Ossip Abramovich Gannibal's father, Pushkin's great-grandfather, was Abram Petrovich Gannibal (1696–1781), an African page kidnapped to Constantinople as a gift to the Ottoman Sultan and later transferred to Russia as a gift for Peter the Great. Abram wrote in a letter to Empress Elizabeth, Peter the Great's daughter, that Gannibal was from the town of "Lagon". Largely on the basis of a mythical biography by Gannibal's son-in-law Rotkirkh, some historians concluded from this that Gannibal was born in a village called Geza-Lamza in the Seraye province of Mdre Bahri kingdom in today's Eritrea. 

Vladimir Nabokov, when researching Eugene Onegin, cast serious doubt on this origin theory. Later research by the scholars Dieudonné Gnammankou and Hugh Barnes eventually conclusively established that Gannibal was instead born in Central Africa, in an area bordering Lake Chad in modern-day Cameroon. After education in France as a military engineer, Gannibal became governor of Reval and eventually Général en Chef (the third most senior army rank) in charge of the building of sea forts and canals in Russia.

Early life
Born in Moscow, Pushkin was entrusted to nursemaids and French tutors, and spoke mostly French until the age of ten. He became acquainted with the Russian language through communication with household serfs and his nanny, Arina Rodionovna, whom he loved dearly and to whom he was more attached than to his own mother. 

He published his first poem at the age of 15. When he finished school, as part of the first graduating class of the prestigious Imperial Lyceum in Tsarskoye Selo, near Saint Petersburg, his talent was already widely recognized on the Russian literary scene. After school, Pushkin plunged into the vibrant and raucous intellectual youth culture of St. Petersburg, which was then the capital of the Russian Empire. In 1820, he published his first long poem, Ruslan and Ludmila, with much controversy about its subject and style.

Social activism
While at the Lyceum, Pushkin was heavily influenced by the Kantian liberal individualist teachings of Alexander Petrovich Kunitsyn, whom Pushkin would later commemorate in his poem 19 October. Pushkin also immersed himself in the thought of the French Enlightenment, to which he would remain permanently indebted throughout his life, especially Voltaire, whom he described as "the first to follow the new road, and to bring the lamp of philosophy into the dark archives of history".

Pushkin gradually became committed to social reform, and emerged as a spokesman for literary radicals. That angered the government and led to his transfer from the capital in May 1820. He went to the Caucasus and to Crimea and then to Kamianka and Chișinău in Bessarabia, where he became a Freemason.

He joined the Filiki Eteria, a secret organization whose purpose was to overthrow Ottoman rule in Greece and establish an independent Greek state. He was inspired by the Greek Revolution and when the war against the Ottoman Empire broke out, he kept a diary recording the events of the national uprising.

Rise

He stayed in Chișinău until 1823 and wrote two Romantic poems, which brought him acclaim: The Captive of the Caucasus and The Fountain of Bakhchisaray. In 1823, Pushkin moved to Odessa, where he again clashed with the government, which sent him into exile on his mother's rural estate of Mikhailovskoye, near Pskov, from 1824 to 1826.

In Mikhaylovskoye, Pushkin wrote nostalgic love poems which he dedicated to Elizaveta Vorontsova, wife of Malorossia's General-Governor. Then Pushkin worked on his verse-novel Eugene Onegin.

In Mikhaylovskoye, in 1825, Pushkin wrote the poem To***. It is generally believed that he dedicated this poem to Anna Kern, but there are other opinions. Poet Mikhail Dudin believed that the poem was dedicated to the serf Olga Kalashnikova. Pushkinist Kira Victorova believed that the poem was dedicated to the Empress Elizaveta Alekseyevna. Vadim Nikolayev argued that the idea about the Empress was marginal and refused to discuss it, while trying to prove that poem had been dedicated to Tatyana Larina, the heroine of Eugene Onegin.

Authorities summoned Pushkin to Moscow after his poem "Ode to Liberty" was found among the belongings of the rebels from the Decembrist Uprising (1825). After his exile in 1820, Pushkin's friends and family continually petitioned for his release, sending letters and meeting with Emperor Alexander I and then Emperor Nicholas I on the heels of the Decembrist Uprising. Upon meeting with Emperor Nicholas I, Pushkin obtained his release from exile and began to work as the emperor's Titular Counsel of the National Archives. However, because insurgents in the Decembrist Uprising (1825) in Saint Petersburg had kept some of Pushkin's earlier political poems, the emperor retained strict control of everything Pushkin published and he was banned from travelling at will.

During that same year (1825), Pushkin also wrote what would become his most famous play, the drama Boris Godunov, while at his mother's estate. He could not however, gain permission to publish it until five years later. The original and uncensored version of the drama was not staged until 2007.

Around 1825–1829 he met and befriended the Polish poet Adam Mickiewicz, during exile in central Russia. In 1829 he travelled through the Caucasus to Erzurum to visit friends fighting in the Russian army during the Russo-Turkish War. In the end of 1829 Pushkin wanted to set off on a journey abroad, the desire reflected in his poem Let's go, I'm ready. He applied for permission for the journey, but received negative response from Nicholas I, on 17 January 1830.

Around 1828, Pushkin met Natalia Goncharova, then 16 years old and one of the most talked-about beauties of Moscow. After much hesitation, Natalia accepted a proposal of marriage from Pushkin in April 1830, but not before she received assurances that the Tsarist government had no intentions to persecute the libertarian poet. Later, Pushkin and his wife became regulars of court society. They officially became engaged on 6 May 1830, and sent out wedding invitations. Due to an outbreak of cholera and other circumstances, the wedding was delayed for a year. The ceremony took place on 18 February 1831 (Old Style) in the Great Ascension Church on Bolshaya Nikitskaya Street in Moscow. 

When the Emperor gave Pushkin the lowest court title, Gentleman of the Chamber, the poet became enraged, feeling that the Emperor intended to humiliate him by implying that Pushkin was being admitted to court not on his own merits but solely so that his wife, who had many admirers including the Emperor himself, could properly attend court balls. Pushkin's marriage to Goncharova was largely a happy one, but his wife’s characteristic flirtatiousness and frivolity would lead to his fatal duel seven years later, for Pushkin had a highly jealous temperament.

In 1831, during the period of Pushkin's growing literary influence, he met one of Russia's other great early writers, Nikolai Gogol. After reading Gogol's 1831–1832 volume of short stories Evenings on a Farm Near Dikanka, Pushkin supported him and would feature some of Gogol's most famous short stories in the magazine The Contemporary, which he founded in 1836.

Death
By the autumn of 1836, Pushkin was falling into greater and greater debt and faced scandalous rumours that his wife was having a love affair. On 4 November, he sent a challenge to a duel to Georges d'Anthès, also known as Dantes-Gekkern. Jacob van Heeckeren, d'Anthès' adoptive father, asked that the duel be delayed by two weeks. With efforts by the poet's friends, the duel was cancelled.

On 17 November, d'Anthès made a proposal to Natalia Goncharova's sister, Ekaterina. The marriage did not resolve the conflict. D'Anthès continued to pursue Natalia Goncharova in public, and rumours that d'Anthès had married Natalia's sister just to save her reputation circulated.

On 26 January (7 February in the Gregorian calendar) of 1837, Pushkin sent a "highly insulting letter" to Gekkern. The only answer to that letter could be a challenge to a duel, as Pushkin knew. Pushkin received the formal challenge to a duel through his sister-in-law, Ekaterina Gekkerna, approved by d'Anthès, on the same day through the attaché of the French Embassy, Viscount d'Archiac.

Pushkin asked Arthur Magenis, then attaché to the British Consulate-General in Saint Petersburg, to be his second. Magenis did not formally accept, but on 26 January (7 February), approached Viscount d'Archiac to attempt a reconciliation; however, d'Archiac refused to speak with him as he was not yet officially Pushkin's second. Magenis, unable to find Pushkin in the evening, sent him a letter through a messenger at 2 o'clock in the morning, declining to be his second as the possibility of a peaceful settlement had already been quashed, and the traditional first task of the second was to try to bring about a reconciliation.

The pistol duel with d'Anthès took place on 27 January (8 February) at the Black River, without the presence of a second for Pushkin. The duel they fought was of a kind known as a barrier duel. The rules of this type dictated that the duellists began at an agreed distance. After the signal to begin, they walked towards each other, closing the distance. They could fire at any time they wished, but the duellist that shot first was required to stand still and wait for the other to shoot back at his leisure.

D'Anthès fired first, critically wounding Pushkin; the bullet entered at his hip and penetrated his abdomen. D'Anthès was only lightly wounded in the right arm by Pushkin's shot. Two days later, on 29 January (10 February) at 14:45, Pushkin died of peritonitis.

At Pushkin's wife's request, he was put in the coffin in evening dress, not in chamber-cadet uniform, the uniform provided by the emperor. The funeral service was initially assigned to the St Isaac's Cathedral, but was moved to Konyushennaya church. Many people attended. After the funeral, the coffin was lowered into the basement, where it stayed until 3 February, when it was removed to Pskov province. Pushkin was buried on the grounds of the Svyatogorsky monastery in present-day Pushkinskiye Gory, near Pskov, beside his mother. His last home is now a museum.

Descendants
Pushkin had four children from his marriage to Natalia: Maria (b. 1832), Alexander (b. 1833), Grigory (b. 1835) and Natalia (b. 1836), the last of whom married morganatically with Prince Nikolaus Wilhelm of Nassau of the House of Nassau-Weilburg and was granted the title of Countess of Merenberg. Her daughter Sophie married Grand Duke Michael Mikhailovich of Russia a grandson of Emperor Nicholas I.

Only the lines of Alexander and Natalia still remain. Natalia's granddaughter, Nadejda, married into the extended British royal family, her husband was the uncle of Prince Philip, Duke of Edinburgh, and is the grandmother of the present Marquess of Milford Haven. Descendants of the poet now live around the globe in the United Kingdom, the Czech Republic, Germany, Belgium, Luxembourg and the United States.

Legacy

Literary
Critics consider many of his works masterpieces, such as the poem The Bronze Horseman and the drama The Stone Guest, a tale of the fall of Don Juan. His poetic short drama Mozart and Salieri (like The Stone Guest, one of the so-called four Little Tragedies, a collective characterization by Pushkin himself in 1830 letter to Pyotr Pletnyov) was the inspiration for Peter Shaffer's Amadeus as well as providing the libretto (almost verbatim) to Rimsky-Korsakov's opera Mozart and Salieri.

Pushkin is also known for his short stories. In particular his cycle The Tales of the Late Ivan Petrovich Belkin, including "The Shot", were well received. According to the literary theorist Kornelije Kvas,  "the narrative logic and the plausibility of that which is narrated, together with the precision, conciseness – economy of the presentation of reality – all of the above is achieved in Tales of Belkin, especially, and most of all in the story The Stationmaster. Pushkin is the progenitor of the long and fruitful development of Russian realist literature, for he manages to attain the realist ideal of a concise presentation of reality". Pushkin himself preferred his verse novel Eugene Onegin, which he wrote over the course of his life and which, starting a tradition of great Russian novels, follows a few central characters but varies widely in tone and focus.

Onegin is a work of such complexity that, though it is only about a hundred pages long, translator Vladimir Nabokov needed two full volumes of material to fully render its meaning in English. Because of this difficulty in translation, Pushkin's verse remains largely unknown to English readers. Even so, Pushkin has profoundly influenced western writers like Henry James.
Pushkin wrote "The Queen of Spades", a short story frequently anthologized in English translation.

Musical
Pushkin's works also provided fertile ground for Russian composers. Glinka's Ruslan and Lyudmila is the earliest important Pushkin-inspired opera, and a landmark in the tradition of Russian music. Tchaikovsky's operas Eugene Onegin (1879) and The Queen of Spades (Pikovaya Dama, 1890) became perhaps better known outside of Russia than Pushkin's own works of the same name.

Mussorgsky's monumental Boris Godunov (two versions, 1868–9 and 1871–2) ranks as one of the very finest and most original of Russian operas.
Other Russian operas based on Pushkin include Dargomyzhsky's Rusalka and The Stone Guest; Rimsky-Korsakov's Mozart and Salieri, Tale of Tsar Saltan, and The Golden Cockerel; Cui's Prisoner of the Caucasus, Feast in Time of Plague, and The Captain's Daughter; Tchaikovsky's Mazeppa; Rachmaninoff's one-act operas Aleko (based on The Gypsies) and The Miserly Knight; Stravinsky's Mavra, and Nápravník's Dubrovsky.

Additionally, ballets and cantatas, as well as innumerable songs, have been set to Pushkin's verse (including even his French-language poems, in Isabelle Aboulker's song cycle "Caprice étrange"). Suppé, Leoncavallo and Malipiero have also based operas on his works. Composers Galina Konstantinovna Smirnova, Yevgania Yosifovna Yakhina, Maria Semyonovna Zavalishina, Zinaida Petrovna Ziberova composed folk songs using Pushkin's text.

The Desire of Glory, which has been dedicated to Elizaveta Vorontsova, was set to music by David Tukhmanov ), as well as Keep Me, Mine Talisman – by Alexander Barykin ) and later by Tukhmanov.

Romanticism
Pushkin is considered by many to be the central representative of Romanticism in Russian literature although he was not unequivocally known as a Romantic. Russian critics have traditionally argued that his works represent a path from Neoclassicism through Romanticism to Realism. An alternative assessment suggests that "he had an ability to entertain contrarities which may seem Romantic in origin, but are ultimately subversive of all fixed points of view, all single outlooks, including the Romantic" and that "he is simultaneously Romantic and not Romantic".

Russian literature
Pushkin is usually credited with developing Russian literature. He is seen as having originated the highly nuanced level of language which characterizes Russian literature after him, and he is also credited with substantially augmenting the Russian lexicon. Whenever he found gaps in the Russian vocabulary, he devised calques. His rich vocabulary and highly-sensitive style are the foundation for modern Russian literature. His accomplishments set new records for development of the Russian language and culture. He became the father of Russian literature in the 19th century, marking the highest achievements of the 18th century and the beginning of literary process of the 19th century. He introduced Russia to all the European literary genres as well as a great number of West European writers. He brought natural speech and foreign influences to create modern poetic Russian. Though his life was brief, he left examples of nearly every literary genre of his day: lyric poetry, narrative poetry, the novel, the short story, the drama, the critical essay and even the personal letter.

According to Vladimir Nabokov, Pushkin's idiom combined all the contemporaneous elements of Russian with all he had learned from Derzhavin, Zhukovsky, Batyushkov, Karamzin and Krylov:

 The poetical and metaphysical strain that still lived in Church Slavonic forms and locutions
 Abundant and natural gallicisms
 Everyday colloquialisms of his set
 Stylized popular speech by combining the famous three styles (low, medium elevation, high) dear to the pseudoclassical archaists and adding the ingredients of Russian romanticists with a pinch of parody.

His work as a critic and as a journalist marked the birth of Russian magazine culture which included him devising and contributing heavily to one of the most influential literary magazines of the 19th century, the Sovremennik (The Contemporary, or Современник). Pushkin inspired the folk tales and genre pieces of other authors: Leskov, Yesenin and Gorky. His use of Russian formed the basis of the style of novelists Ivan Turgenev, Ivan Goncharov and Leo Tolstoy, as well as that of subsequent lyric poets such as Mikhail Lermontov. Pushkin was analysed by Nikolai Gogol, his successor and pupil, and the great Russian critic Vissarion Belinsky, who produced the fullest and deepest critical study of Pushkin's work, which still retains much of its relevance.

Soviet centennial celebrations

The centennial year of Pushkin's death, 1937, was one of the most significant Soviet-era literary centennials in Stalinist Russia, rivaled only by the 1928 centennial commemorating Leo Tolstoy's birth. Despite the public display of visage on ever present billboards and candy wrappers, Pushkin's "image" conflicted with that of the ideal Soviet (he was reputed as a libertine with unrepentant aristocratic tendencies) and was subject to a repressive revisionism, similar to the Stalinist state's clean up of Tolstoy's Christian anarchism.

Honours

Shortly after Pushkin's death, contemporary Russian romantic poet Mikhail Lermontov wrote "Death of the Poet". The poem, which ended with a passage blaming the aristocracy being (as oppressors of freedom) the true culprits in Pushkin's death, was not published (nor could have been) but was informally circulated in St. Petersburg. Lermontov was arrested and exiled to a regiment in the Caucasus.
Montenegrin poet and ruler Petar II Petrović-Njegoš included in his 1846 poetry collection Ogledalo srpsko (The Serbian Mirror) a poetic ode to Pushkin, titled Sjeni Aleksandra Puškina.
In 1929, Soviet writer, Leonid Grossman, published a novel, The d'Archiac Papers, telling the story of Pushkin's death from the perspective of a French diplomat, being a participant and a witness of the fatal duel. The book describes him as a liberal and a victim of the Tsarist regime. In Poland the book was published under the title Death of the Poet.
In 1937, the town of Tsarskoye Selo was renamed Pushkin in his honour.
There are several museums in Russia dedicated to Pushkin, including two in Moscow, one in Saint Petersburg, and a large complex in Mikhaylovskoye.
Pushkin's death was portrayed in the 2006 biographical film Pushkin: The Last Duel. The film was directed by Natalya Bondarchuk. Pushkin was portrayed on screen by Sergei Bezrukov.
The Pushkin Trust was established in 1987 by the Duchess of Abercorn to commemorate the creative legacy and spirit of her ancestor and to release the creativity and imagination of the children of Ireland by providing them with opportunities to communicate their thoughts, feelings and experiences.
A minor planet, 2208 Pushkin, discovered in 1977 by Soviet astronomer Nikolai Chernykh, is named after him. A crater on Mercury is also named in his honour.

 MS Aleksandr Pushkin, second ship of the Russian Ivan Franko class (also referred to as "poet" or "writer" class).
 A station of Tashkent metro was named in his honour.
 The Pushkin Hills and Pushkin Lake were named in his honour in Ben Nevis Township, Cochrane District, in Ontario, Canada.
 UN Russian Language Day, established by the United Nations in 2010 and celebrated each year on 6 June, was scheduled to coincide with Pushkin's birthday.
 A statue of Pushkin was unveiled inside the Mehan Garden in Manila, Philippines to commemorate the Philippines–Russia relations in 2010.
 The Alexander Pushkin diamond, the second largest found in Russia and the former territory of the USSR, was named after him.
 On 28 November 2009, a Pushkin Monument was erected in Asmara, capital of Eritrea.
 In 2005 a monument to Pushkin and his grandmother Maria Hannibal was commissioned by an enthusiast of Russian culture Just Rugel in Zakharovo, Russia. Sculptor V. Kozinin
In 2019, Moscow's Sheremetyevo International Airport was named after Pushkin in accordance to the Great Names of Russia contest.

 Following the 2022 Russian invasion of Ukraine monuments dedicated to Pushkin in Ukraine were demolished and Pushkin streets were renamed.

 In December 2022, a monument to the poet Alexander Sergeevich Pushkin was unveiled on the territory of Gymnasium No. 1 in Sevastopol. The bust of the poet was created by the sculptor Denis Stritovich.

Gallery

Works

Narrative poems 
 1820 – Ruslan i Ludmila (Руслан и Людмила); English translation: Ruslan and Ludmila
 1820–21 – Kavkazskiy plennik (Кавказский пленник); English translation: The Prisoner of the Caucasus
 1821 – Gavriiliada (Гавриилиада); English translation: The Gabrieliad
 1821–22 – Bratia razboyniki (Братья разбойники); English translation: The Robber Brothers
 1823 – Bakhchisarayskiy fontan (Бахчисарайский фонтан); English translation: The Fountain of Bakhchisaray
 1824 – Tsygany (Цыганы); English translation: The Gypsies
 1825 – Graf Nulin (Граф Нулин); English translation: Count Nulin
 1829 – Poltava (Полтава)
 1830 – Domik v Kolomne (Домик в Коломне); English translation: The Little House in Kolomna
 1833 – Andzhelo (Анджело); English translation: Angelo
 1833 – Medny vsadnik (Медный всадник); English translation: The Bronze Horseman
 1825–1832 (1833) – Evgeniy Onegin (Евгений Онегин); English translation: Eugene Onegin

Drama 
 1825 – Boris Godunov (Борис Годунов); English translation by Alfred Hayes: Boris Godunov
 1830 – Malenkie tragedii (Маленькие трагедии); English translation: 
 Kamenny gost (Каменный гость); English translation: The Stone Guest
 Motsart i Salieri (Моцарт и Сальери); English translation: Mozart and Salieri
 Skupoy rytsar (Скупой рыцарь); English translations: The Miserly Knight, or The Covetous Knight
 Pir vo vremya chumy (Пир во время чумы); English translation: A Feast in Time of Plague

Prose

Short stories
 1831 – Povesti pokoynogo Ivana Petrovicha Belkina (Повести покойного Ивана Петровича Белкина); English translation: The Tales of the Late Ivan Petrovich Belkin
 Vystrel (Выстрел); English translation: The Shot, short story
 Metel (Метель); English translation: The Blizzard, short story
 Grobovschik (Гробовщик); English translation: The Undertaker, short story
 Stantsionny smotritel (Станционный смотритель); English translation: The Stationmaster, short story
 Baryshnya-krestianka (Барышня-крестьянка); English translation: The Squire's Daughter, short story
 1834 – Pikovaya dama (Пиковая дама); English translation: The Queen of Spades, short story
 1834 – Kirjali (Кирджали); English translation: Kirdzhali, short story
 1837 – Istoria sela Goryuhina (История села Горюхина); English translation: The Story of the Village of Goryukhino, unfinished short story
 1837 – Egypetskie nochi (Египетские ночи); English translation:

Novels
 1828 – Arap Petra Velikogo (Арап Петра Великого); English translation: The Moor of Peter the Great, unfinished novel
 1829 – Roman v pis'makh (Роман в письмах); English translation: A Novel in Letters, unfinished novel
 1836 – Kapitanskaya dochka (Капитанская дочка); English translation: The Captain's Daughter, novel
 1836 – Roslavlyov (Рославлев); English translation: Roslavlev, unfinished novel
 1841 – Dubrovsky (Дубровский); English translation: Dubrovsky, unfinished novel

Non-fiction
 1834 – Istoria Pugachyova (История Пугачева); English translation: A History of Pugachev, study of the Pugachev's Rebellion
 1836 – Puteshestvie v Arzrum (Путешествие в Арзрум); English translation: A Journey to Arzrum, travel sketches

Fairy tales in verse 
 1822 – Царь Никита и сорок его дочерей; English translation: Tsar Nikita and His Forty Daughters
 1825 – Жених; English translation: The Bridegroom
 1830 – Сказка о попе и о работнике его Балде; English translation: The Tale of the Priest and of His Workman Balda
 1830 – Сказка о медведихе; English translation: The Tale of the Female Bear, or The Tale of the Bear (was not finished)
 1831 – Сказка о царе Салтане; English translation: The Tale of Tsar Saltan
 1833 – Сказка о рыбаке и рыбке; English translation: The Tale of the Fisherman and the Fish
 1833 – Сказка о мертвой царевне; English translation: The Tale of the Dead Princess
 1834 – Сказка о золотом петушке; English translation: The Tale of the Golden Cockerel

See also

 Anton Delvig
 Aleksandra Ishimova
 Anna Petrovna Kern
 Fyodor Petrovich Tolstoy
 Literaturnaya Gazeta
 Pushkin Prize
 Vasily Pushkin
 Vladimir Dal
 Kapiton Zelentsov, contemporary illustrator of Pushkin's novels
 UN Russian Language Day
 Demolition of monuments to Alexander Pushkin in Ukraine

Notes

References

Further reading
 Binyon, T.J. (2002) Pushkin: A Biography. London: HarperCollins ; US edition: New York: Knopf, 2003 
 Yuri Druzhnikov (2008) Prisoner of Russia: Alexander Pushkin and the Political Uses of Nationalism, Transaction Publishers 
 Dunning, Chester, Emerson, Caryl, Fomichev, Sergei, Lotman, Lidiia, Wood, Antony (Translator) (2006) The Uncensored Boris Godunov: The Case for Pushkin's Original Comedy University of Wisconsin Press 
 Feinstein, Elaine (ed.) (1999) After Pushkin: versions of the poems of Alexander Sergeevich Pushkin by contemporary poets. Manchester: Carcanet Press; London: Folio Society 
 
 Pogadaev, Victor (2003) Penyair Agung Rusia Pushkin dan Dunia Timur (The Great Russian Poet Pushkin and the Oriental World). Monograph Series. Centre For Civilisational Dialogue. University Malaya. 2003, 
 Vitale, Serena (1998) Pushkin's button; transl. from the Italian by Ann Goldstein. New York: Farrar, Straus & Giroux 
 DuVernet, M.A. (2014) Pushkin's Ode to Liberty. US edition: Xlibris 
 Телетова, Н.К. (Teletova, N.K.) (2007) Забытые родственные связи А.С. Пушкина (The forgotten family connections of A.S. Pushkin). Saint Petersburg: Dorn 
 Wolfe, Markus (1998) Freemasonry in life and literature. Munich: Otto Sagner ltd. 
 Wachtel, Michael. "Pushkin and the Wikipedia" Pushkin Review 12–13: 163–66, 2009–2010
 Jakowlew, Valentin. "Pushkin's Farewell Dinner in Paris" (Text in Russian) Koblenz (Germany): Fölbach, 2006, .
 Galgano Andrea (2014). The affective dynamics in the work and thought of Alexandr Pushkin, Conference Proceedings, 17th World Congress of the World Association for Dynamic Psychiatry. Multidisciplinary Approach to and Treatment of Mental Disorders: Myth or Reality?, St. Petersburg, 14–17 May 2014, In Dynamische Psychiatrie. Internationale Zeitschrift für Psychotherapie, Psychoanalyse und Psychiatrie – International Journal for Psychoanalysis, Psychotherapy, and Psychiatry, Berlin: Pinel Verlag GmbH, 1–3, Nr. 266–68, 2015, pp. 176–91.

External links

 
 
 
 
 Biographical essay on Pushkin. By Mike Phillips, British Library (Pdf).
 The Pushkin Review, annual journal of North American Pushkin Society. Retrieved 2010-10-19
 English translations of Pushkin's poems. Retrieved 2013-04-26
 English translation of "The Tale of the Female Bear"
 List of English translations of Eugene Onegin with extracts
 List of English translations of The Bronze Horseman with extracts
 Alexander Pushkin. Mozart and Saliery in English
 Alexander Pushkin. Boris Godunov in English
 Alexander Pushkin. The Bronze Horseman in English
 Alexander Pushkin poetry(rus)
 Pushkin's poetry translated to English by Margaret Wettlin 
 
 Alexander Pushkin Quotes
  Alexander Pushkin Fairy Tales: Russian Text

 
19th-century short story writers from the Russian Empire
19th-century translators from the Russian Empire
Dramatists and playwrights from the Russian Empire
Novelists from the Russian Empire
Male writers from the Russian Empire
Poets from the Russian Empire
Short story writers from the Russian Empire
Translators from the Russian Empire
Russian male dramatists and playwrights
Russian male novelists
Russian male poets
Russian male short story writers
Romantic poets
French-language poets
Russian-language writers
Italian–Russian translators
Translators of Dante Alighieri
Writers from Moscow
Russian nobility
Russian Freemasons
Philhellenes
Members of the Russian Academy
Tsarskoye Selo Lyceum alumni
Russian people of Cameroonian descent
People from the Russian Empire of African descent
People from the Russian Empire of German descent
People from the Russian Empire of Swedish descent
Russian people of Scandinavian descent
People from Moscow Governorate
Russian duellists
Duelling fatalities
Deaths by firearm in Russia
1799 births
1837 deaths
Russian fantasy writers